Herbert Spencer (22 June 1924 – 11 March 2002) was a British designer, editor, writer, photographer and teacher. He was born in London.

Life and work
Spencer was an RAF cartographer during the Second World War. He taught typography at the Central School of Arts and Crafts from 1949 to 1955. In 1966 he became a senior research fellow in the print research department of the Royal College of Art; he was a professor of graphic arts there from 1978 until 1985.

In 1949 Spencer founded Typographica, a design and visual arts journal. He was editor of all the thirty-two issues published, in two series of sixteen issues each, from 1949 until it closed in 1967. He also designed and wrote for it. Between 1964 and 1973 Spencer was also editor of The Penrose Annual.

Road signs

Spencer wished to prove that British road signs were chaotic. He therefore photographed road signs and published the results in two photographic essays in  Typographica in 1961. As a result, the Ministry of Transport set up the Worboys Committee in 1963 to devise a consistent system of signage for British road signs.

Publications
Pioneers of Modern Typography was a book Spencer wrote in 1969. It drew on and re-used material previously published by Spencer in the journal Typographica, which had brought to Britain some of the typographical experiments and design history of continental Europe. Lund Humphries described the book as follows: 

 Design in Business Printing, 1952
 Traces of Man (with photographs by Herbert Spencer), Lund Humphries, London, 1967.
 The Visible Word (legibility studies at RCA), Royal College of Art, London, first édition in 1968, second edition in 1969.
 Words, words, words London, Cologne, 1972
 New Alphabets A to Z (with Colin Forbes). London, NY, 1973
 The Liberated page London, 1987

References

Further reading
 Typographica, by Rick Poynor, Princeton Architectural Press, 2001.

1924 births
2002 deaths
British graphic designers
Academics of the Central School of Art and Design